Plumb Grove, also known as the Nesbitt-Warner House, is a historic house and farm near Clear Spring, Maryland. The house was built about 1832 in the Federal style on a property called "Nesbitt's Inheritance." The lands and house remained in the Nesbitt family until 1893, when they were sold to Rosa E. Warner. The Warner family occupied the house until 1967, when the property was purchased by the Washington County Board of Education as the site for Clear Spring Middle and High Schools.

Plumb Grove was placed on the National Register of Historic Places on December 7, 2011. It is owned by the Clear Spring District Historical Association. It has been restored and is open to the public.

References

External links
, including undated photo, at Maryland Historical Trust

Houses on the National Register of Historic Places in Maryland
Houses completed in 1851
Houses in Washington County, Maryland
Federal architecture in Maryland
1851 establishments in Maryland
National Register of Historic Places in Washington County, Maryland